Jonathan Erlich and Andy Ram were the defending champions, but Bob Bryan and Mike Bryan defeated them 4–6, 7–6(7–2), [10–7], in the final.

Seeds
All seeds receive a bye into the second round.

Draw

Finals

Top half

Bottom half

External links
Draw

Doubles